Carson MacCormac is a Canadian actor.

Early life 
MacCormac grew up in Oakville, Ontario. Although he began taking acting courses in 2011, his passion as a teenager was for baseball. He played for the Oakville A's, a youth league team run by the Oakville Minor Baseball Association. Carson began acting professionally in about 2016, and in 2017 was a provincial finalist in Senior Music Theatre – Group B of the Ontario Music Festivals Association.

Career 
MacCormac made his professional and television acting debut on April 10, 2017, in the episode "You Don't Understand Me at All" of the CBC Television series Bellevue. He made his motion picture debut a few weeks later in the 2017 short film Cold Hands, where he played a teenage boy coming to terms with his sexual assault.

Carson made his feature film debut in the independent drama Giant Little Ones in September 2018, where he played a bullied teenager named Michael. He later appeared in the Lifetime cable network film Zombie at 17 and in eight episodes of the TVO Kids television series Big Top Academy.

MacCormac appears in the 2019 superhero film Shazam! as Brett Bryer. He has also appeared in the 2019 dystopian science fiction film Riot Girls, and makes appearances in the 2020 Netflix original horror series, October Faction and in the second season of the Netflix series Locke & Key as Benjamin Locke in 2021.

Filmography

Film

Television

References

External links

People from Oakville, Ontario
Place of birth missing (living people)
Male actors from Ontario
Living people
Canadian male film actors
Canadian male television actors
Year of birth missing (living people)